Amphidromus johnstanisici is a species of large-sized air-breathing tree snail, an arboreal gastropod mollusk in the family Camaenidae.

Location 
Amphidromus johnstanisici is known to inhabit Central Vietnam, Gia Lai Province, K'bang District.

Habitat 
Amphidromus johnstanisici are generally found in trees or areas with a high tree density.

Etymology 
This species is named after Australian terrestrial snail researcher, Dr. John Stanisic.

References 

Gastropods described in 2017
johnstanisici